Duvvuri (Telugu: దువ్వూరి) is an Indian surname. People using this surname generally hail from the village of Duvvur in Kadapa district of Andhra Pradesh or from East and West Godavari districts in Andhra Pradesh.

Notable people
 Duvvuri Subbarao, retired IAS officer and former Governor of the Reserve Bank of India. 
 Duvvuri Ramireddy, famous Telugu poet writer.
 Duvvuri Bhaskara Reddy, an eminent pathologist.

Surnames of Indian origin